The Videos can refer to the following:

The Videos, Vol. 1, compilation by Winger
The Videos (Brandy compilation)
The Videos (Dannii Minogue)
The Videos (Kylie Minogue VHS)
The Videos (Nickelback DVD)
The Videos (Roxette video)
The Videos (Musical group), 1950's doo-wop group
The Videos 1989–2004, compilation by Metallica
The Videos 1992–2003, compilation by No Doubt
The Videos 1994–2001, compilation by Dave Matthews Band
The Videos 86>98, compilation by Depeche Mode
The Videosingles, compilation by Tears for Fears